Jesse Tittsworth (born 26 February 1979), better known under his stage name Tittsworth, is an American DJ, producer, night club owner, and record label owner. He has worked with Q-Tip, Theophilus London, Pitbull, Kid Sister and Alvin Risk. He co-founded T&A Records, Hermanito Label, and U Street Music Hall.

Career
Tittsworth established his own record label in 2006 with partner DJ Ayres, T&A records. T&A Records has played an important role in cultivating multiple movements in dance music, especially Baltimore club and moombahton.

Tittsworth has released over a dozen vinyl records, including Ammo's last release (A-Trak's battle imprint), a highly sought after white Serato record and a variety of dance records since 2005.

Tittsworth's debut album was called 12 Steps. The LP featured Pitbull, Nina Sky, Kid Sister and The Federation. The Pitbull collaboration predated the EDM influx and gained the eye of Ministry of Sound. Follow up songs included the moombahton track Pendejas with Alvin Risk. He also collaborated with Alvin Risk and Maluca on La Campana, which appeared in FIFA 12.

In 2010, Tittsworth helped open, as co‐owner, U Street Music Hall.  U Hall was named as a top ten venue in the US. Its sound system was ranked #2 and received high praise from patron and A-list DJ's alike. Tittsworth would be a critical part of the club's operations, bookings and artist liaison for the first two years. He would also DJ dozens of nights in its first five years.

In 2014, Tittsworth released a single "Que Fresca" with reggaeton veteran DJ Blass. His next single "After The Dance" featured Q-Tip and Theophilus London and was lauded by critics as "a timeless dancefloor motivator that would fit as well in a set with say "Rapture" as "Step Into A World". It reached 3 overall most popular song on The Hype Machine.

Vibe named him as one of "10 Dance Music DJs Your Should Know By Now.". He has appeared on worldwide festivals, from ADE to raves like Hard Day of the Dead.

Discography

Albums 
 Twelve Steps (2008)

EPs and singles
 The Bonus (2006)
 White Label Exclusives (2007)
 The Afterparty (2007)
 Broke Ass Nigga (2008)
 WTF feat. Kid Sister & Pase Rock (2008)
 Drunk As Fuck feat. The Federation (2009)
 Here He Comes feat. Nina Sky & Pitbull (2009)
 Remixes (2010)
 Molly's Party feat. Ninjasonik (2010)
 Two Strokes Raw (with Alvin Risk) (2011)
 Juicy Jorts feat. Rez & Des McMahon (2012) 
 Club 219 (2013) 
 Give It To Dem feat. Shelco Garcia & TeenWolf (2013)
 TNT feat. Valentino Khan (2014) 
 After The Dance feat. Q-Tip, Theophilus London, & Alison Carney (2014)

Remixes
 Scanners - "Salvation (Tittsworth Remix)" (2009)
 AC Slater - "BanGer (Tittsworth Remix)" (2009)
 Rob Threezy - "Let's Go Ravers (Tittsworth Remix)" (2010)
 Clicks & Whistles - "Neva Get Caught (Tittsworth Remix)" (2011)
 Nadastrom - "Diabluma Theme (Tittsworth Remix)" (2012)
 Breach - "Jack (Tittsworth & Alex Eljaiek Remix)" (2013)
 Scottie B & King Tut - "African Chant (Tittsworth Remix)" (2013)

References

1979 births
Living people
American DJs
American record producers
Nightclub owners